Isaiah Philmore (born 20 September 1989) is an American-born German professional basketball player for Alba Fehérvár of the Nemzeti Bajnokság I/A (NB1) in Hungary. Philmore was born in the United States but grew up in Bad Vilbel, Germany.

References

External links
 Eurocup Profile
 German BBL Profile
 Eurobasket.com Profile
 Xavier Musketeers bio

1989 births
Living people
CSU Sibiu players
EWE Baskets Oldenburg players
German expatriate sportspeople in Romania
German men's basketball players
German people of American descent
People from Bad Vilbel
Power forwards (basketball)
Ratiopharm Ulm players
Basketball players from El Paso, Texas
Sportspeople from Darmstadt (region)
Telekom Baskets Bonn players
Towson Tigers men's basketball players
Tigers Tübingen players
Xavier Musketeers men's basketball players
German expatriate basketball people in France
German expatriate sportspeople in Hungary